Potassium arsenate usually refers to tripotassium arsenate  but can refer to any of:

 Monopotassium arsenate, 
 Dipotassium arsenate, 
 Tripotassium arsenate,